Zelotes is a genus of ground spiders that was first described by J. Gistel in 1848.

Species
 it contains approximately 400 species:

References

Gnaphosidae
Araneomorphae genera
Cosmopolitan spiders